The 2004 Davidoff Swiss Indoors was a men's tennis tournament played on indoor carpet courts. It was the 35th edition of the event known that year as the Davidoff Swiss Indoors, and was part of the International Series of the 2004 ATP Tour. It took place at the St. Jakobshalle in Basel, Switzerland, from 24 October through 30 October 2004. Jiří Novák won the singles title.

Finals

Singles

 Jiří Novák defeated  David Nalbandian, 5–7, 6–3, 6–4, 1–6, 6–2

Doubles

 Bob Bryan /  Mike Bryan defeated  Lucas Arnold Ker /  Mariano Hood, 7–6(11–9), 6–2

References

 
Davidoff Swiss Indoors
Swiss Indoors